Virginia Waters is a defunct provincial electoral district for the House of Assembly of Newfoundland and Labrador, Canada. The district was represented by former premier Kathy Dunderdale.

A residential district in the northeast end of St. John's, the area included Airport Heights, Wedgewood Park, residential areas off Newfoundland Drive, as well as a fairly wealthy enclave near Virginia Lake. The district was created in 1995 from parts of the districts of Pleasantville, St. John's East Extern and Mount Scio Road-Bell Island. Virginia Waters retained 80 per cent of its original territory in the 2007 redistribution, while taking in 14 per cent of Cape St. Francis. In 2011 there were 9,938 eligible voters living within the district.

The district was abolished in 2015, into new districts of Windsor Lake and Virginia Waters-Pleasantville.

Members of the House of Assembly
The district has elected the following Members of the House of Assembly:

Election results 
}
|-

|-

|align="right"|1,892
|align="right"|39.05
|align="right"|-20.99
|-
 
|NDP
|Sheilagh O'Leary
|align="right"|1,021
|align="right"|21.07
|align="right"|-9.35

|}

|-

|-
 
|NDP
|Dave Sullivan
|align="right"|1,708
|align="right"|30.42
|align="right"|+17.59
|-

|}

|-

|-
 
|NDP
|David Sullivan
|align="right"|710
|align="right"|12.83
|align="right"|+3.60
|-

|-

|Independent
|Fred Wilcox 
|align="right"|353
|align="right"|6.38
|align="right"|-

|}
^ Change is not from redistributed results.

|-

|-

|-
 
|NDP
|David Sullivan
|align="right"|666
|align="right"|9.23
|align="right"|-4.92

|}

 
|NDP
|Amanda Will
|align="right"|887
|align="right"|14.15
|align="right"|+5.74

|Independent
|Deanne Stapleton
|align="right"|131
|align="right"|2.09
|align="right"| 

|}

 
|NDP
|Bob Buckingham
|align="right"|550
|align="right"|8.41

|}

References

External links 
Elections Newfoundland and Labrador Website
Website of the Newfoundland and Labrador House of Assembly

Newfoundland and Labrador provincial electoral districts
Politics of St. John's, Newfoundland and Labrador